Austroperipatus aequabilis is a species of velvet worm in the Peripatopsidae family. This species has 15 pairs of legs in both sexes.

References

Further reading

Onychophorans of Australasia
Onychophoran species
Animals described in 1996